Clypastrea is a genus of beetles belonging to the family Corylophidae.

The genus was first described by Haldeman in 1842.

The genus has cosmopolitan distribution.

Species include:

References

Corylophidae
Coccinelloidea genera